The 1889 Notre Dame football team was an American football team that represented the University of Notre Dame in the 1889 college football season. The team had no coach and played only one game during the fall of 1889, a 9–0 victory over Northwestern at Evanston, Illinois, on November 14, 1889.  The victory over Northwestern University was the first over another collegiate football team for the Notre Dame Fighting Irish football program.  It was also Notre Dame's first win against a future FBS football program.  It would not be until 1897, with a 34–5 win against Michigan Agricultural (known today as Michigan State), that this accomplishment would be replicated.

Schedule

References

Notre Dame
College football undefeated seasons
Notre Dame Fighting Irish football seasons
Notre Dame football